Barclay Radebaugh (born September 14, 1965) is an American college basketball coach.  He is the head of the men's basketball team at Charleston Southern University.

Radebaugh is a two-time Big South Conference Coach of the Year (2012, 2015). In 2015, he  led Charleston Southern to the regular season Big South Conference title and the most regular season wins in program history (19).

Head coaching record

References

External links
 Charleston Southern profile

1965 births
Living people
American men's basketball coaches
Basketball coaches from North Carolina
Charleston Southern Buccaneers men's basketball coaches
East Tennessee State Buccaneers men's basketball coaches
East Tennessee State University alumni
Furman Paladins men's basketball coaches
Miami Hurricanes men's basketball coaches
People from Lincolnton, North Carolina
Queens Royals men's basketball coaches
South Carolina Gamecocks men's basketball coaches
Winthrop Eagles men's basketball coaches
Wofford Terriers men's basketball coaches